Sterculia schliebenii is a species of plant in the family Malvaceae. It is found in Kenya, Mozambique, and Tanzania.

References

schliebenii
Vulnerable plants
Taxonomy articles created by Polbot
Plants described in 1935